George Carstairs may refer to:
 George Carstairs (rugby league), Australian rugby league player
 George Carstairs (missionary) (1880–1948), Scottish missionary in India
  George Morrison Carstairs (1916–1991), known as Morris Carstairs, British psychiatrist, his son